Tradescantia virginiana, the Virginia spiderwort, is a species of flowering plant in the family Commelinaceae. It is the type species of Tradescantia native to the eastern United States. It is commonly grown in many gardens and also found growing wild along roadsides and railway lines.

Description
Tradescantia virginiana is a perennial herbaceous plant with alternate, simple leaves, on tubular stems. The flowers are blue, purple, magenta, or white, borne in summer.

Cultivation
Tradescantia virginiana likes most moist soils but can adapt to drier garden soils. Plants may be propagated from seed but they are more easily started from cuttings or divisions.

Range
Tradescantia virginiana is found in eastern North America, west to Missouri, south to northern South Carolina and Alabama, and north to Ontario, Vermont, and Michigan.  Much of the northern range, however, may represent garden escapes rather than indigenous wild populations.

References

Flora of the Eastern United States
virginiana
Plants described in 1753
Taxa named by Carl Linnaeus
Garden plants